Mohammad Tannous (born March 12, 1992) is a Jordanian football player who plays as a midfielder for Al-Jazeera.

References

External links 
 
 jo.gitsport.net
 

Jordanian footballers
Association football midfielders
Al-Jazeera (Jordan) players
1992 births
Living people